Robenacoxib, sold under the brand name Onsior, is a nonsteroidal anti-inflammatory drug (NSAID) used in veterinary medicine for the relief of pain and inflammation in cats and dogs. It is a COX-2 inhibitor (coxib).

References

External links 
 

COX-2 inhibitors
Nonsteroidal anti-inflammatory drugs
Fluoroarenes
Anilines
Carboxylic acids
Veterinary drugs